Ingo "Mr. Smile" Schwichtenberg (18 May 1965 – 8 March 1995) was a German drummer and one of the founding members of the power metal band Helloween.

Biography
Helloween guitarist Roland Grapow said about Schwichtenberg in an interview 1999: 

The song "Step Out of Hell" from the Helloween album Chameleon is written by Roland Grapow about Schwichtenberg's problems with drug abuse.

After a six-hour telephone call with Michael Weikath, in which he explained why they had made that hard and painful decision, Ingo was asked to leave Helloween after the album Chameleon. Schwichtenberg was apparently somewhat dissatisfied with the direction of the band as well, even going as far as to refer to their song from the Chameleon album "Windmill", as "Shitmill". Michael Kiske said about the recording: "Ingo was very sick, that was the last thing he did, after he did the drumming he had a breakdown." Drummer Ritchie Abdel Nabi covered immediate commitments and played on the Chameleon Tour.

After Helloween, Schwichtenberg's father had died in February 1995, and he slid further and further into his schizophrenic episodes, culminating in his suicide on 8 March 1995 by jumping in front of an S-train in his native hometown Hamburg. He was 29 years old.

Schwichtenberg's replacement in the band was Uli Kusch. Helloween dedicated the album The Time of the Oath to him. His friend Kai Hansen had dedicated the song "Afterlife" from Gamma Ray's Land of the Free to him. Michael Kiske also made a tribute to Schwichtenberg with the track "Always" from his first solo album Instant Clarity.

Discography 
With Helloween
Helloween (1985)
Walls of Jericho (1985)
Keeper of the Seven Keys Part 1 (1987)
Keeper of the Seven Keys Part 2 (1988)
Pink Bubbles Go Ape (1991)
Chameleon (1993)

With Doc Eisenhauer
Alles Im Lack (1992) – drums on "Pharao"

References

External links 
 Official Helloween band website
 A tribute to Ingo Schwichtenberg on kingofdrums.net

1965 births
1995 suicides
German heavy metal drummers
Male drummers
Suicides in Germany
Suicides by train
People with schizophrenia
20th-century German musicians
20th-century drummers
20th-century German male musicians
1995 deaths